Succ, SUCC, or S.U.C.C. may refer to:
 sucC RNA motif
 State-universal coupled cluster
 Sydney University Cricket Club
 A slang term for fellatio, derived from "suck".

See also
 SUC (disambiguation)
 Zucc (disambiguation)
 Suck (disambiguation)